Jalen Moore may refer to:

Jalen Moore (basketball, born 1995), American basketball player
Jalen Moore (basketball, born 1999), American basketball player

See also

 List of people with surname Moore